Talinopsis is a genus of flowering plants in the family Anacampserotaceae. It has only one currently accepted species, Talinopsis frutescens, native to the US states on New Mexico and Texas, and northeast, central and southwest Mexico. A succulent, it uses C3 carbon fixation.

References

Monotypic Caryophyllales genera
Anacampserotaceae
Succulent plants
Flora of New Mexico
Flora of Texas
Flora of Northeastern Mexico
Flora of Central Mexico
Flora of Southwestern Mexico
Plants described in 1852